The 2000–01 season was FK Partizan's 9th season in First League of Serbia and Montenegro. This article shows player statistics and all matches (official and friendly) that the club played during the 2000–01 season.

Players

Squad information

Competitions

First League of FR Yugoslavia

League table

FR Yugoslavia Cup

UEFA Cup

Qualifying round

First round

See also
 List of FK Partizan seasons
 Partizanopedia 2000-2001  (in Serbian)

References

FK Partizan seasons
Partizan